Belaj is a settlement in the former Dajç municipality, Shkodër County, northern Albania. At the 2015 local government reform it became part of the municipality Shkodër.

References

Dajç, Shkodër
Populated places in Shkodër
Villages in Shkodër County